The 1948 Cork Junior Hurling Championship was the 51st staging of the Cork Junior Hurling Championship since its establishment by the Cork County Board.

On 13 December 1948, Carrigtwohill won the championship following a 6-05 to 1-01 defeat of CLoughduv in the final at the Cork Athletic Grounds. This was their third championship title overall and a first title since 1941.

Results

Final

References

Cork Junior Hurling Championship
Cork Junior Hurling Championship